Song Kang-ho (born January 17, 1967) is a South Korean actor. Song made his film debut in The Day a Pig Fell into the Well (1996), and came to national prominence with a series of critically acclaimed performances, including No. 3 (1997), Joint Security Area (2000), Sympathy for Mr. Vengeance (2002), Memories of Murder (2003), The Host (2006), and A Taxi Driver (2017). Song rose to international prominence for his performances in Snowpiercer (2013) and Parasite (2019), the latter of which won the Palme d'Or at the Cannes Film Festival and the Academy Award for Best Picture. He was awarded Best Actor at the 75th Cannes Film Festival for his performance in Broker. In 2020, The New York Times ranked him #6 on its list of the 25 Greatest Actors of the 21st Century. He has been named Gallup Korea's Film Actor of the Year four times (2013, 2017, 2019 and 2020).

Early life 
Song Kang-ho was born in Gimhae, South Gyeongsang Province, South Korea on January 17, 1967. He graduated from Gimhae High School and dreamed of becoming an actor since his sophomore year at Garak Middle School. At the time, there were only five theater and film departments nationwide, but after failing once in the entrance exam, he went on to study at the Department of Broadcasting and Entertainment at Gyeongsang National University in Busan. Soon after, Song was drafted to his mandatory military enlistment. Afterward, when he was 23 years old, he did not go back to college, but started acting in a local theater company in Busan.

Career

Early career 
In 1990, Song wanted saw Yeonwoo Stage's play "Mr. Choi" in Busan. He was 23 years old when He moved to Seoul to pursue his dream. Song begged Ryu Tae-ho, who was Yeonwoo Stage director to at least let him stay as theater cleaning service. In 1991, Song eventually made his stage debut in Yeonwoo Stage's play Dongseung (A Little Monk), and spent few years onstage and made his name as a talented stage actor.

In 1995 Song joined Theater Company Chaimu, founded by theater director Lee Sang-woo, as founding member.

Although regularly approached to act in films, Song always turned down the opportunity until he was in his 30s, when Song finally accept a role as an extra in Hong Sang-soo's 1996 film The Day a Pig Fell into the Well. Then, Song drew attention for his acting as Pan-soo in Lee Chang-dong's Green Fish in 1997. Song's performance as a gangster who and wielded an iron pipe and jumped into the car of Mak-dong (played by Han Seok-kyu) in an underground parking lot was so realistic that there were even rumors that a real gangster was cast. The following year Song portrayed one of the homeless in Jang Sun-woo's documentary-style Bad Movie. Song gained cult notoriety for his performance in Song Neung-han's No. 3 as Jopil, a stuttering gangster who train a group of young recruits. Song became the most notable actor in 1997, sweeping the Best New Actor Award at the Grand Bell Awards and the Blue Dragon Film Awards.

Path to Leading Actors 
Director Kim Jee-woon was the one who opened a new path for Song, who had cast as bullies and gangsters. Director Kim cast Song as Young-min, the eldest son of Park In-hwan and Na Moon-hee, in his debut film, The Quiet Family where Song showed the essence of comic cruelty acting. Song took on his first leading role as secret agent Lee Jang-gil, Han Suk-kyu's partner, in Kang Je-gyu's blockbuster thriller Shiri. However, it was director Kim Jee-woon who elevated Song into leading actor status in his film The Foul King. Released in cinema in February 2000, Song acted as Lim Dae-ho, a bank clerk turn professional wrestling, for which he did most of his own stunts. Song's comic acting was topped with deep pathos and his popularity increased. Song always said that this role was his hardest role as an actor.

His performance in Myung Film production Joint Security Area as North Korean Army sergeant Oh Joong-pil, established Song as one of South Korea's leading actors. He won the Best Actor Award at the 38th Grand Bell Awards for his performance. Song also starred in one of Park Chan-wook acclaimed trilogy, Sympathy for Mr. Vengeance, which centers on a father's pursuit of his daughter's kidnappers. In 2002, Song starred in another major production by Myung Films, YMCA Baseball Team, about Korea's first baseball team which formed in the early 20th century.

Prominence 
In 2003, Song played a leading role as Park Doo-man, an incompetent rural detective, in another critically acclaimed hit, Memories of Murder, from young director Bong Joon-ho. It was the first of several critically acclaimed movies they would make together, with commentators describing Bong's relationship with Song as a "great actor-director collaboration". With it, Song swept the best actor awards at various awards ceremonies, including the 40th Grand Bell Awards in 2003, establishing himself as the best actor in the Korean film industry in the early 2000s.

In 2004, Song starred in The President's Barber by debut director Im Chan-sang, which imagines the life of South Korean president Park Chung-hee's personal barber. The following year he also took the lead in Antarctic Journal, a big-budget project by debut director Yim Pil-sung about an expedition in Antarctica that performed weakly at the box office.

In 2006, through director Bong Joon-ho's film The Host, Song rose to the ranks of 10 million actors. The film helped to broaden international awareness of Song's talent, and in March 2007 he was named Best Actor at the inaugural Asian Film Awards in Hong Kong. More high-profile projects followed: The Show Must Go On about an aging gangster,

Song starred opposite Jeon Do-yeon in Lee Chang-dong's film Secret Sunshine (2007), as local mechanic in Miryang Kim Jong-chan and won Best Actor in 6th Korean Film Awards,10th Director's Cut Awards, and Palm Springs International Film Festival. Jeon Do-yeon won the Prix d'interprétation féminine (Best Actress) at the 2007 Cannes Film Festival, making her the first Korean ever to receive an acting award at Cannes Film Festival.

In 2008, Song acted in Kim Jee-woon's western film set in 1930s Japanese-occupied Manchuria, The Good, the Bad, the Weird. The film showcased an ensemble of stars with Lee Byung-hun as "the good", Jung Woo-sung  as "the bad" and Song  as "the weird". It was the second highest grossing Korean film in 2008 after Scandal Makers, beating The Chaser and it is one of the highest grossing films of all time in South Korea which attracted 6.68 million viewers.

In 2009, Song acted in Park Chan-wook's vampire film Thirst, opposite Kim Ok-vin. Song notably appeared full frontally nude in this film. In the same year, Song acted as North Korean spy Ji-won in spy thriller Secret Reunion. A shoot out in the middle of the city brings together Ji-won and National Intelligence Service agent Lee. The operation to capture an assassin spy known as ’Shadow’ ends in disaster and the agent Lee is dismissed from his post. Ji-won is also abandoned by his organization after being framed as a traitor.

Two 2012 films, the gangster love story Hindsight, and the suspense film Howling, were considered as Song's box office slump. However, in 2013, Song Kang-ho made a splendid resurrection by becoming an actor of 20 million through three films in which he appeared. Starting the English-language dystopian blockbuster Snowpiercer with 9.35 million viewers. The period drama The Face Reader, where Song acted as Nae-kyeong, the greatest face reader of Joseon, who can see through people by looking at their faces, reached 9.13 million viewers. The Attorney which was inspired by Roh Moo-hyun's early days as a human rights Lawyer, was breaking records, surpassing 10 million viewers only within 32 days, the shortest time ever.

Song continued to star in a number of critically acclaimed films, including Lee Joon-ik's period film The Throne. Song played as King Yeongjo, the Korean ruler who infamously had his belligerent son, the Crown Prince Sado (played by Yoo Ah-inYoo Ah-in), suffocated to death in a large wooden chest filled with rice. Later, Song reunited with director Kim Jee-woon after eight years period action film The Age of Shadows. Song won Best Actor in 53rd Baeksang Arts Awards for his role as Lee Jung-chool, a Korean police captain that has been charged by the Japanese colonial government with rooting out members of the country's resistance movement. The success of the film in reaching over the 7.4 million viewer mark, made Song the first leading actor in Korean cinema to record over 100 million admissions throughout the course of his career.

In 2016, Song starred in film A Taxi Driver, as Kim Man-seo, a widowed taxi driver. The film centers on a taxi driver from Seoul who unintentionally becomes involved in the events of the Gwangju Uprising in 1980. It is based on a real-life story of German journalist Jürgen Hinzpeter's interactions with driver Kim Sa-bok. The film was released on August 2, 2017 in South Korea. On the same day, the film had its international premiere at the Fantasia International Film Festival in Montreal, where Song was awarded as Best Actor for his role in the film.

International Stardom 
In 2019, Song starred as Kim Ki-taek in the critically acclaimed film Parasite, also directed by his frequent collaborator Bong Joon-ho. It won the Palme d'Or at the 2019 Cannes Film Festival, becoming the first Korean film to receive the award. It was selected as the South Korean entry for Best International Feature Film at the 92nd Academy Awards, Bong's second selection after 2009's Mother.

In 2020, The New York Times released a list of The 25 greater actors of the century. In the list of 25 internationally known screen figures, Song Kang-ho was ranked sixth. The newspaper also published an interview with director Bong Joon-ho. Song is known as Bong’s muse, having featured in four of his films.

In the same year it was announced that Song co-starred in Kore-eda Hirokazu’s debut Korean-language film Broker, alongside Lee Ji-eun, Bae Doona and Gang Dong-won. He started filming in 2021, acted as Ha Sang-hyeon, the owner of a hand laundry who takes babies from a baby box at a nearby church and sells them with the help of his partner Dong-soo.

In 2021, Song was selected as one of the nine judges in the competition section of the 74th Cannes Film Festival to be held from July 6 to July 17. In the same year, Song reteamed for the fifth time with leading Korean director Kim Jee-woon on their upcoming feature film Cobweb. The scriptwriter of Cobweb was Shin Yeon-shick, who also wrote the screenplay for sports film One Win, in which Song also starred.

The following year, Broker was released on June 8, 2022. Song was awarded Best Actor at the 75th Cannes Film Festival for his performance in Broker. Song was first Korean to win Best Actor Award at Cannes.

Song also acted in title role in blockbuster disaster film Emergency Declaration. Song plays the role of the detective In-ho. This film is directed by Han Jae-rim, who worked with Song in historical film The Face Reader (2013). The film was first screened in the out of competition section of the 74th Cannes Film Festival on July 16, 2021. It was slated to release theatrically in January 2022, but due to a new wave of the COVID-19 pandemic its release was delayed. It was finally released theatrically in South Korea on August 3, 2022 and was released in the United States on August 12, 2022.

Venture to small screen 
In 2022, it was reported that Song will act alongside Byun Yo-han in his television series debut with Uncle Sam Shik. The series is set in 1960s and depicts the tale of two men, their pride, greed and bromance. The series is written by Shin Yeon-shick and directed by him. It will be the third project between Song and Shin, with whom Song has recently shot feature films Coweb and One Win.

Endorsement 
In 2001, Song was signed with traditional liquor company Kooksoondang to promote traditional liquor called baeksaju. Thanks to Song, the popularity of the brand in Japan was sky-rocketing. The contract renewed for five years from 2001 to 2005. In 2009 Song signed a 3-year exclusive CF model contract with Kooksoondang. Exclusive models generally sign contracts for 6 months or 1 year, then extend the contract yearly. Song's 3-year model contract is the first in the industry.

Song also did advertisements for other products such as food, electronic, and finance. In 2002, He was a model for Kimchi refrigerator brand. In 2003 he modeled for pizza brand. In 2005, Song received 100 million won guarantee as model for air purifier brand. In 2007, Hana Financial Group announced that Song and Jeon Do-yeon were selected as their new advertising models. In 2008, Song was in CF movie for Hyundai Card with Jung Woo-sung and Lee Byung-hun. In 2012, Chungmuro pride trio, Song with Choi Min-sik and Seol Gyeong-gu were selected as NH Nonghyup Bank's advertising model. In 2014, Nongshim hired Song and Yu Hae-jin as the advertising models of their ramen. Nongshim Shin Ramyun upgraded its taste and design after 28 years since its launch, with advertisement concept focuses on the better taste of Shin Ramyun.

Following success of Parasite, in 2020, Song back to advertising world after a six-year break. Lina Life Insurance announced on September 28 that it has signed a contract with Song Kang-ho. He also did overseas CF for China's Lilith Games popular strategy game 'Rise of Kingdoms'.

Personal life 
Song married Hwang Jang-suk in 1995, with whom he has two children. Their son, Song Jun-pyoung, born in 1996, is a former football player for Suwon Samsung Bluewings, despite Song's opposition.

In 2005, Song was found by the police to be drunk driving with a blood alcohol content of 0.095%. His license was suspended for 100 days.

Philanthropy 
On March 6, 2022, Song donated 100 million won to the Hope Bridge Disaster Relief Association to help the damage from the massive wildfire that started in Uljin, Gyeongbuk and spread to Samcheok, Gangwon.

On July 22, 2022, Song donated 200 million won each at the start of the March 2020 corona crisis and another 100 million won when the east coast bushfires broke out in March, and joined the 'Honors Club', a large donor group.

Filmography

Film

Television series

Theater

Awards and nominations

State honors

Listicles

Notes

References

External links 

 
 
 Song Kang-ho at Cine21 
 

South Korean male film actors
South Korean male stage actors
People from Gimhae
Outstanding Performance by a Cast in a Motion Picture Screen Actors Guild Award winners
Best Actor Asian Film Award winners
1967 births
Living people
20th-century South Korean male actors
21st-century South Korean male actors
Cannes Film Festival Award for Best Actor winners
Grand Prize Paeksang Arts Award (Film) winners
Recipients of the Order of Cultural Merit (Korea)